The Archdeacon of Kells, alias the Archdeacon of Nobber, was a medieval ecclesiastical post in the Diocese of Meath in the Kingdom of Meath, Ireland. The Archdeaconry was officially established sometime between the 11th and 13th centuries, and was annexed to the Rectory of Nobber. In the 16th Century, the office was briefly united to the Bishopric of Meath, but afterwards separated again. As a consequence of the Reformation, the Archbishop of Armagh (Church of Ireland) held the "". Sometime before 1622, the Archdeacon of Kells and Rectory of Nobber were permanently united to the bishopric of Meath.

Background
Before the dissolution of the Monasteries and Henrican reforms of the 16th century took full effect in Ireland, there were Archdeacons of Kells, County Meath. The Diocese of Kells was established sometime after the Synod of Kells (1152), and incorporated with the Diocese of Meath after 1211. The deanery of Kells was created by Simon (de) Rochford, Bishop of Meath, in 1216. At the time, it was one of twelve rural deaneries in Meath, later becoming one of the two archdeaconries of the same diocese.

Nobber was once an important town in the Kingdom of Meath, and the Rectory of Nobber was united to this dignity; thus the holder was sometimes called Rector of Nobber, Parson of Nobber, or most commonly styled Archdeacon of Nobber. Confusingly, the archdeacon of Kells held the Rectory of Nobber, while the archdeacon of Meath held the Rectory of Kells.

Archdeacons

In the High Middle Ages it was the most senior diocesan position below a bishop in the Roman Catholic Church. An archdeacon is often responsible for administration within an archdeaconry, which is the principal subdivision of the diocese. It is nearly impossible to fully catalogue the succession of holders of this ancient office. Nonetheless, the information below is preserved.

* aft. = after
* bef. = before
* d. = died
* res. = resigned
* att. = attainted

Dissolution
In 1543, Edward Staples, Bishop of Meath, appropriated the Archdeaconry of Kells and the Rectory of Nobber to his Episcopal see, or rather the temporalities of the offices. The union was sealed by license from the  king, dated 27 December 1544. Nonetheless, the Archdeaconry of Kells expressed itself again in 1547, with Thomas Lockwood still incumbent.  The reason for the brief union of offices is unclear, but it is known many religious houses in Ireland resisted dissolution until well into the reign of Elizabeth I. On 12 March 1569, Thomas Lancaster, an English Protestant clergyman, consecrated Archbishop of Armagh (Church of Ireland) on 12 June 1568, was given license to hold in commendam the post of archdeaconry of kells, and the rectory of Nobber. According to the "Regal Visitation Book", sometime before 1622, the office of "", was permanently united to the bishopric of Meath.

Notes and references

Notes

Citations

Primary sources

Secondary sources

Bibliography 

  

Roman Catholic Diocese of Meath
Medieval Ireland
Religion in County Meath
Archdeacons of Kells